In mathematics, in particular in differential geometry, the minimal volume is a number that describes one aspect of a smooth manifold's topology. This topological invariant was introduced by Mikhael Gromov.

Given a smooth Riemannian manifold , one may consider its volume  and sectional curvature . The minimal volume of a smooth manifold  is defined to be

Any closed manifold can be given an arbitrarily small volume by scaling any choice of a Riemannian metric. The minimal volume removes the possibility of such scaling by the constraint on sectional curvatures. A trivial example, the only in which the possibility of scaling is present, is a closed flat manifold. The Berger spheres show that the minimal volume of the three-dimensional sphere is also zero. Gromov has conjectured that every closed simply connected odd-dimensional manifold has zero minimal volume.

According to the Gauss-Bonnet theorem, if  is a closed and connected two-dimensional manifold, then . The infimum in the definition of minimal volume is realized by the metrics appearing from the uniformization theorem. More generally, according to the Chern-Gauss-Bonnet formula, if  is a closed and connected manifold then 

Gromov, in 1982, showed that the volume of a complete Riemannian metric on a smooth manifold can always be estimated by the size of its curvature and by the simplicial volume of the manifold, via the inequality

References
Misha Gromov. Metric structures for Riemannian and non-Riemannian spaces. Based on the 1981 French original. With appendices by M. Katz, P. Pansu and S. Semmes. Translated from the French by Sean Michael Bates. Progress in Mathematics, 152. Birkhäuser Boston, Inc., Boston, MA, 1999. xx+585 pp. .  
 Michael Gromov. Volume and bounded cohomology.  Inst. Hautes Études Sci. Publ. Math. 56 (1982), 5–99.

Riemannian geometry